Gastroleccinum is a fungal genus in the family Boletaceae. It is a monotypic genus, represented by the single species Gastroleccinum scabrosum. The genus was circumscribed by Harry Delbert Thiers in 1989.

See also
List of North American boletes

References

Boletaceae
Monotypic Boletales genera